Nothing Ever Hurt Me (Half as Bad as Losing You) is an album by country music artist George Jones released in 1973, on the Epic Records label. It peaked at number 12 on the Billboard Country Albums chart.

Recording and composition
After several saccharine duet albums with then-wife Tammy Wynette, Jones's third solo album on Epic was a return to his roots insomuch as Billy Sherrill's Phil Spector-influenced production would allow.  More of the songs were up-tempo, a change of pace from his first two albums for the label.  The title track, for example, is a novelty recorded at a blistering speed and contains tongue twisting lyrics about a country boy for whom nothing ever went right (the song would reach number 7 on the charts).  The album also features "Mom And Dad's Waltz", a song originally written and performed by one of Jones's biggest musical influences Lefty Frizzell.  The album's hit single was "What My Woman Can't Do", which rose to number 6.  Jones helped Sherrill and Earl Montgomery write the song and also collaborated with Wynette on the prophetic "Wine (You've Used Me Long Enough)".

Reception
Thom Jurek of AllMusic praises the album as "a dynamite set that offered a solid look at what Jones and Sherrill were capable of - and delivered - in the coming years" and calls Jones's interpretation of Don Gibson's "Made For The Blues" and Frizzell's "Mom and Dad's Waltz" "solid, tender honky tonk ballads that offer the deep, raw emotion in the singer's best material."

Track listing

References

External links
 George Jones' Official Website
 Record Label

1973 albums
George Jones albums
Albums produced by Billy Sherrill
Epic Records albums